The Tre Valli Varesine is a semi classic European bicycle race held in Varese, Italy. Since 2005, the race has been organised as a 1.HC event on the UCI Europe Tour.

It is usually the first and most important race of Trittico Lombardo, which consists of three races held around the region of Lombardy on three consecutive days. These races are Tre Valli Varesine, Coppa Ugo Agostoni and Coppa Bernocchi.

Winners

Wins per country

References

External links
 

UCI Europe Tour races
Cycle races in Italy
Classic cycle races
Recurring sporting events established in 1919
1919 establishments in Italy
Sport in Lombardy
Super Prestige Pernod races